Hinterstocker is a German surname. Notable people with the surname include:

 Benjamin Hinterstocker (born 1979), German ice hockey coach
 Hermann Hinterstocker (born 1956), German ice hockey player
 Ludwig Hinterstocker (1931–2020), German footballer
 Martin Hinterstocker (disambiguation), multiple people

German-language surnames